These Wilder Years is a 1956 American drama film directed by Roy Rowland and starring James Cagney and Barbara Stanwyck. It is the story of a businessman who tries to find the illegitimate son he gave up to an orphanage many years ago.

The film marked the first and only onscreen pairing of Hollywood stars Cagney and Stanwyck.

Plot
A Detroit business tycoon, Steve Bradford, tells his board of directors without explanation that he is taking a leave of absence. He travels to his small hometown, where it turns out that his goal is to find a son he put up for adoption 20 years before.

Steve turns to Ann Dempster, who runs an orphanage, explaining how he has achieved success in life, but feels a void left by his absent and unknown son. Ann explains that she is ethically required to conceal the identity of foster children and parents. Steve tries charming her, cajoling, even bribing, to no avail, then brings in his lawyer, James Rayburn, to seek other ways of finding the boy.

Although he has befriended Ann, he betrays her with a charge of fraud, resulting in a courtroom hearing that could cost her both her vocation and reputation. A furious Ann digs up records that prove how Steve specifically expressed no wish to ever see his child 20 years before.

At the orphanage, meantime, he strikes up an acquaintance with a pregnant 16-year-old, Suzie, who has been abandoned by her child's father. Steve takes a personal interest in the girl, particularly after she is injured in an auto accident and needs surgery that she fears could endanger the baby.

With the case dismissed and overcome with guilt, Steve goes bowling.  He is approached by a young man named Mark Nelson, who turns out to be his missing son.  Nelson claimed he had been following the progress of the trial. They have a heart to heart talk and part with no plans to be in each other's lives. Steve believes that this seemingly coincidental meeting was privately arranged by Ann, out of the goodness of her heart, which turns out to be true. Steve adopts Suzie so she doesn't have to give up her child. Suzie names her son after him.

Cast
 James Cagney as Steve Bradford
 Barbara Stanwyck as Ann Dempster
 Walter Pidgeon as James Rayburn
 Betty Lou Keim as Suzie
 Don Dubbins as Mark
 Edward Andrews as Mr. Spottsford
 Basil Ruysdael as Judge
 Grandon Rhodes as Roy Oliphant
 Will Wright as Old Cab Driver
 Lewis Martin as Dr. Miller
 Dorothy Adams as Aunt Martha
 Dean Jones as Hardware Clerk
 Mary Lawrence as Mrs. Callahan 
 Herb Vigran as Traffic Cop
 Michael Landon as Boy in pool hall
 Tom Laughlin as Football player on airplane

Box office
According to MGM records the film earned $572,000 in the US and Canada and $305,000 elsewhere, resulting in a loss of $600,000.

See also
List of American films of 1956

References

External links
 
 
 

1956 films
1956 drama films
American drama films
American black-and-white films
Films about adoption
Films directed by Roy Rowland
Metro-Goldwyn-Mayer films
Teenage pregnancy in film
1950s English-language films
1950s American films